Jonathan Schmude (born 31 May 1992) is a German former professional footballer who played as a right-back.

Career
Schmude began his career with SV Werder Bremen, and made his debut for the reserve team in December 2011, as a substitute for Leon Balogun in a 3–2 defeat to Arminia Bielefeld in the 3. Liga. In 2013, he signed for Hannover 96 II.

External links
 
 

1992 births
Living people
Footballers from Bremen
German footballers
Association football fullbacks
SV Werder Bremen II players
Hannover 96 II players
3. Liga players